is a Japanese video game designer and amateur musician who has contributed to the visual design and music of the Lumines series of games. He served as the art director of the original PSP game and as the director of Lumines Supernova for the PlayStation 3. Yokota created the original prototype of Lumines and composed three songs, which were later arranged for the album Lumines Remixes.

Selected games
Panzer Dragoon Zwei (1996): Ending CG illustrations
Panzer Dragoon Saga (1998): Illustrations
Rez (2001): Art Director & Lead Artist
Lumines (2004): Art Director, Composer (in collaboration with Takayuki Nakamura)
Lumines Supernova (2008): Director

References

External links
Interview: Nakamura, Yokota On The Origins Of Lumines Supernova

Japanese male musicians
Japanese musicians
Japanese video game designers
Living people
Video game artists
Video game composers
Year of birth missing (living people)